Affoltern am Albis is a railway station in the Swiss canton of Zürich, situated in the municipality of Affoltern am Albis. The station is located on the Zürich to Zug via Affoltern am Albis railway line. Affoltern am Albis station is less than 30 minutes from Zürich Hauptbahnhof.

On the Zug side there are three sidings, which are rarely used, and a former siding from the OVA site. The old station with its two platform tracks was completely rebuilt in 2001. The level crossing at the OVA site was abolished and replaced by a bicycle and passenger underpass. The station received a third platform track and all buildings were replaced. The station forecourt was rebuilt and a bus station was built. The integrated bus terminal has eight stops for the provisional six bus routes to the region as well as to Cham, Zürich, Muri and Thalwil. In September 2002, the current station was inaugurated with a festival.

Service 
Affoltern am Albis station is an intermediate stop on Zürich S-Bahn line S5, as well as being the terminus of line S14. During weekends, there is also a nighttime S-Bahn service (SN5) offered by ZVV.

Summary of S-Bahn services:

 Zürich S-Bahn:
 : half-hourly service to  via .
 Nighttime S-Bahn (only during weekends):

Gallery

References

External links 

Affoltern am Albis station on Swiss Federal Railway's web site

Railway stations in the canton of Zürich
Swiss Federal Railways stations
Railway stations in Switzerland opened in 1864